Dennington is a town in the Western District of Victoria, Australia. At the 2016 census, Dennington had a population of 1,907.

The town was home to a large bulk milk powder plant operated by New Zealand dairy co-operative, Fonterra. When opened by Nestlé in 1911, it was the world's largest condensed milk plant. The plant was closed in 2019 and is now owned by Provico.

The town lies on the Merri River.

References

Towns in Victoria (Australia)
City of Warrnambool